Allmend is a request stop railway station in the municipality of Lauterbrunnen in the Swiss canton of Bern. The station is on the Wengernalpbahn (WAB), whose trains operate from Lauterbrunnen to Kleine Scheidegg via Wengen.

Downhill of the station, the line enters an avalanche gallery.

The station is served by the following passenger trains:

Gallery

References

External links 
 

Railway stations in the canton of Bern